Mukha-Dora (Nuka-Dora) is one of the Dravidian languages spoken in India. It is spoken by a scheduled tribe, who use Telugu as their primary language. It is spoken by the eponymous Scheduled Tribe in the state of Andhra Pradesh, India.

Sathupati Prasanna Sree has developed a unique script for use with the language.

References
 

Dravidian languages
Scheduled Tribes of Andhra Pradesh